We Are What We Are is a 2010 Mexican horror film directed by Jorge Michel Grau. A stand-alone sequel to Cronos (1993), the film is about a family who, after the death of the father, try to continue on with a disturbing, ritualistic tradition. The film stars Paulina Gaitán and Daniel Giménez Cacho, the latter of whom reprises his role from Cronos.

Plot
At a shopping mall, a father suddenly dies on the sidewalk. At home, his family is wondering what has become of him. Dad is a watchmaker who repairs watches at the street market, and the family's sole means of support.

As Dad has not appeared for the day's work, Alfredo and Julián head to the market. Julián gets into a fight with a customer who claims that his watch is three weeks overdue. The woman who runs the market appears and tells the boys to get out; the rent for their booth at the market is three weeks in arrears.

When the boys arrive at home, their sister Sabina enters in a state of shock and announces that their father has died. Their mother, Patricia, locks herself in her room; the children wonder who is going to provide for the family now—specifically, their meals: this family performs cannibalistic rituals.

In a morgue, Tito the coroner and the director of the funeral home bring in Octavio and Owen, two police detectives. The coroner shows them a finger in a jar: it was pulled from Dad's stomach. The detectives are asked to solve this cold case. Initially, they resist, but as the film continues, they become more interested in the fame that will come with solving it.

Alfredo and Julián attempt to kidnap a homeless child from under a bridge, but are chased off by the other children. Next, they attempt to kidnap a prostitute, who also resists; Julián punches and stuffs her into the back seat of their car.

Back at home, the boys tie the prostitute to the kitchen table. Patricia comes in and beats the woman to death with a shovel, claiming that Alfredo does not know what he is doing, and that prostitutes are not appropriate for the ritual. Alfredo runs out while Julián and Sabina wrap the dead woman in a sheet. Julián and Patricia take the prostitute back to the corner where the boys picked her up and dump her in front of the other street workers. Patricia tells the women to leave her sons alone. The prostitutes report the incident to detectives Octavio and Owen.

Alfredo goes looking for another potential meal; he finds one in a gay bar. Alfredo brings the young man home with him, but Julián says he will not eat a homosexual man. As Alfredo and Julián argue the point, an older man comes down from their mother's room. Alfredo's prey escapes while Patricia beats the older man over the head with a shovel and the family later kills him.

As Sabina and Patricia prepare the man for eating, Alfredo and Julián chase after the gay boy. The boy runs to a fast food stand and asks the police to protect him. Detectives Octavio and Owen hear the call over their police radio and head to the scene. They decline to call for backup, as they want to keep the glory of the collar for themselves.

Detective Octavio stops Alfredo and Julián in an alley, but is shot by a beat cop who mistakes Octavio for one of the cannibals. Detective Owen discovers Sabina and Patricia preparing their meal in a ritualistic fashion, but the women kill him. Alfredo and Julián arrive home; Patricia insists on completing the ritual, but Alfredo drags her away to escape over the rooftops.

The police break into the family's home and Julián shoots several of them before the family manages to hide upstairs. Their mother says that one must survive to carry on the ritual and flees to the rooftop. The prostitutes earlier in the film see her escaping and pursue her.

Meanwhile, Alfredo bites Sabina's neck. Julián, thinking Alfredo's attempting to eat Sabina, shoots Alfredo. The police kill Julián and take Sabina away in an ambulance, believing that she is a surviving victim. The next morning Patricia's body is discovered in a playground, beaten to death.

After escaping from the hospital, Sabina watches a young man in the market, intent on her next meal.

Cast
 Humberto Yáñez as Dad
 Carmen Beato as Patricia the Mother
 Francisco Barreiro as Alfredo the Older Brother
 Alan Chávez as Julián the Younger Brother
 Paulina Gaitán as Sabina the Sister
 Daniel Giménez Cacho as Tito the Coroner, a character that previously appeared in the horror film Cronos (1993)
 Juan Carlos Colombo as Director of the funeral home
 Jorge Zárate as Detective Owen
 Esteban Soberanes as Detective Octavio
 Octavio Michel as Teniente
 Miguel Ángel Hoppe as Gustavo
 Raúl Kennedy as Adán
 Adrián Aguirre as Adriana
 Miriam Balderas as Sheyla

Production
The director Jorge Michel Grau himself narrated his film on the 2010 Cannes Film Festival. We Are What We Are was completely shot in Mexico City. Daniel Giménez Cacho reprised his role as Tito the Coroner, a character from the horror film Cronos from 1993, directed by Guillermo del Toro. Some characters are also played by Paulina Gaitán and Francisco Barreiro who won with his former project Perpetuum Mobile film the Best Mexican Feature award on the Guadalajara International Film Festival.

Release
It featured the Mexico's National Film School and premiered on 15 March 2010 as part of the Guadalajara International Film Festival. The film tells of the violence of the people and their foreclosure and was part of the Cannes Film Market 2010. The Mexican horror film is part of the Fantasia 2010. The film was released in the United States by IFC Films as We Are What We Are. The film had his UK premiere on 30 August 2010 as part of the Film4 FrightFest 2010. IFC Films released the film in the United States in late 2010 as a video on demand title under their genre label IFC Midnight., while Artificial Eye released it in the United Kingdom on 12 November 2010.

Soundtrack
The score was composed by Odd Crew.

Reception
Deborah Young of Reuters said, that We Are What We Are "is perhaps too dark and relentlessly humorless to find wide international audiences." Young stated that "another limiting factor is the difficulty of identifying with any of the characters, who are played expressively but still remain abstract and alien, distant from the viewer."

Rotten Tomatoes gives the film a 72% based on 47 reviews from critics, with an average rating of 5.78/10. The site's critics consensus reads, "We Are What We Are is elevated horror that combines family drama and social politics, with plenty of gore on top."

Awards
Fantastic Fest
Best Film
Best Screenplay
Fantasia International Film Festival
Séquences Ex-Aequo Award
Expresión en Corto International Film Festival
Best First Film
Chicago International Film Festival
Silver Hugo-Special Jury Prize
Festival international du film fantastique de Gérardmer
Jury Prize

Remake

Memento Films International optioned the rights for an English-language remake starring Julia Garner and Ambyr Childers, directed by Jim Mickle and written by Mickle and Nick Damici, who previously worked together on Mulberry Street and Stake Land.

References

External links
 
 

2010 films
2010s Spanish-language films
Films shot in Mexico
Mexican horror films
2010 horror films
Films set in Mexico
Films about cannibalism
2010s Mexican films